Dillan Ismail (born 2 April 1992) is a Swedish footballer who plays as a centre back.

Career
Playing six season with Umeå FC, he left for Dalkurd FF in 2019. After a good season with Dalkurd, he returned to Umeå in March 2020.

Personal life
Dillan is of Kurdish origins. Aside from being a footballer, Dillan Ismail also works as a doctor.

References

External links

1992 births
Living people
Swedish footballers
Association football defenders
IK Sirius Fotboll players
Gamla Upsala SK players
Enköpings SK players
Umeå FC players
Dalkurd FF players
Superettan players
Ettan Fotboll players
Footballers from Uppsala